Aidan Simmons (born 26 May 2003) is an Australian footballer who plays as a forward for A-League club Western Sydney Wanderers.

Club Career

Western Sydney Wanderers
On 9 June 2022, Simmons joined the Wanderers on a two year scholarship deal from Sydney rivals Sydney FC. He made his professional senior debut against Western United.

International Career
Simmons was selected for the Australian U-20 national team to play in the 2023 AFC U-20 Asian Cup. He played in the first group game losing 1-0 to Vietnam. He started again against Iran where he scored the opening goal of the game, slotting it easily in the net, the game ended in a 3-2 win for Australia.

References 

2003 births
Living people
Australia youth international soccer players
Australia under-20 international soccer players
Association football forwards
Western Sydney Wanderers FC players
Sydney FC players
A-League Men players
Australian soccer players